Barbara Farris, (born September 10, 1976), is a retired basketball player formerly of the WNBA.

On May 29, 2009, Farris signed with the Detroit Shock.

Farris previously played for the New York Liberty. In the 2007 season she played in 28 regular-season games and all three of the Liberty's playoff appearances.  Farris started in 2006, but was relegated to the bench after the Liberty acquired Janel McCarville, Jessica Davenport, and Tiffany Jackson in 2007.

Farris graduated from St. Martin's Episcopal School in 1994. She is a member of the St. Martin's Alumni Athletic Hall of Fame. Farris graduated in 1998 from Tulane University, where she majored in sociology.  As a member of the Tulane Green Wave women's basketball team, she was named to the Conference USA All-Star first team in her junior year and posted a total of 34 double-doubles.

From 2000 to 2005, Farris played for the WNBA's Detroit Shock.  She also has played professionally in France, Spain, and Korea, and for the New England Blizzard in the American Basketball League.

In 2004, Ferris was inducted into the Tulane Athletics Hall of Fame.

In 2017, Ferris was inducted into the Greater New Orleans Sports Hall of Fame.

She has been an assistant coach with the New York Liberty.

Tulane statistics
Source

Notes

External links
Farris signs with the Phoenix Mercury
Tulane bio

1976 births
Living people
African-American basketball players
American women's basketball coaches
American women's basketball players
Basketball coaches from Louisiana
Basketball players from Louisiana
New England Blizzard players
New York Liberty coaches
New York Liberty players
People from Harvey, Louisiana
Phoenix Mercury players
Power forwards (basketball)
Tulane Green Wave women's basketball players
21st-century African-American sportspeople
21st-century African-American women
20th-century African-American sportspeople
20th-century African-American women